Fernanda Contri (born 1935) is an Italian retired jurist and politician. She is one of the Italian women who hold senior positions in the Italian judiciary system.

Biography
Contri was born in 1935. She joined the Higher Council of the Judiciary in 1986. She was the minister of state in the cabinet led by Prime Minister Giuliano Amato in the period 1992–1993. Then she was named the minister of social affairs to cabinet of Carlo Azeglio Ciampi in 1993 and was in office until March 1994. From October 1993 to February 1994 she developed an immigration reform bill in a commission called the Contri Commission. However, due to the fall of the cabinet in March 1994, the bill, known as Contri Bill, was not approved and materialized although it was the most comprehensive legal framework on immigration in Italy and offered many advantages to the migrants.

In 1996, President Oscar Luigi Scalfaro appointed her to the Constitutional Court as a judge which she held until 2005. During her term she also served as its vice president in 2004.

References

External link

20th-century Italian women politicians
20th-century Italian jurists
21st-century Italian judges
1935 births
Living people
Women government ministers of Italy